Lupinacci is a surname of Italian origin. Notable people with the surname include:

Chad A. Lupinacci (born 1979), American politician
Ercole Lupinacci (1933–2016), Italian Roman Catholic bishop

References

Surnames of Italian origin